is a Japanese footballer currently playing as a left back for Kawasaki Frontale.

Career statistics

Club
.

Notes

References

2000 births
Living people
Association football people from Saitama Prefecture
Ryutsu Keizai University alumni
Japanese footballers
Association football defenders
J1 League players
Kawasaki Frontale players